The 2004 Vuelta a Asturias was the 48th edition of the Vuelta a Asturias road cycling stage race, which was held from 12 May to 16 May 2004. The race started and finished in Oviedo. The race was won by Iban Mayo of the  team.

General classification

References

Vuelta Asturias
2004 in road cycling
2004 in Spanish sport